100 wickets in a season is a notable feat in the sport of cricket, achieved by bowlers. It refers to having taken 100 wickets in first-class cricket only, although some individuals have managed to do so in County Championship matches alone, which is more challenging.

The feat has only rarely been achieved anywhere other than in England, due to the smaller number of fixtures elsewhere. In England, since the number of games in the County Championship was greatly reduced in 1969, the feat has become rare.

Notes
 RADFORD 1985 109 WICKETS
RADFORD 1987 101 WICKETS

References
 Most Wickets in a Season in County Championship from CricketArchive

First-class cricket records